Franco Piero Donato (born September 8, 1981, in Cairo) is an Egyptian skeet sport shooter. Donato represented Egypt at the 2008 Summer Olympics in Beijing, where he competed in the men's skeet shooting. He finished only in thirty-sixth place by one point ahead of Qatar's Rashid Hamad from the final attempt, for a total score of 106 targets. He also participated in the Rio 2016 Olympics

References

https://web.archive.org/web/20130506172727/http://weekly.ahram.org.eg/2009/947/sp2.htm
http://www.shooting.by/events/2009/n_090509.html

External links
NBC Olympics Profile

Living people
1981 births
Egyptian male sport shooters
Skeet shooters
Olympic shooters of Egypt
Shooters at the 2008 Summer Olympics
Shooters at the 2016 Summer Olympics
Sportspeople from Cairo
Egyptian people of Italian descent
21st-century Egyptian people